The Short-Timers is a 1979 semi-autobiographical novel by U.S. Marine Corps veteran Gustav Hasford, about his experience in the Vietnam War. Hasford served as a combat correspondent with the 1st Marine Division during the Tet Offensive of 1968. As a military journalist, he wrote stories for Leatherneck Magazine, Pacific Stars and Stripes, and Sea Tiger. The novel was adapted into the film Full Metal Jacket (1987) by Hasford, Michael Herr, and Stanley Kubrick.

In 1990, Hasford published the sequel The Phantom Blooper: A Novel of Vietnam. The two books were supposed to be part of a "Vietnam Trilogy", but Hasford died before writing the third installment.

Plot summary 
The book is divided into three sections, written in completely different styles of prose, and follows James T. "Joker" Davis through his enlistment in the United States Marine Corps and deployment to Vietnam.

Joker and his fellow Marines refer to military personnel in various ways. A "short" service-member, or "short-timer", is one who is approaching the end of his tour of duty in Vietnam, described in the novel as 385 days for Marines and 365 days for members of other armed services. "Lifers" are distinguished not necessarily by their length of time served, but rather by their attitude toward the lower ranks. (Joker describes the distinction as follows: "A lifer is anybody who abuses authority he doesn't deserve to have. There are plenty of civilian lifers.") Finally, the term "poges" (an alternative spelling for the slang term "pogues") is short for "Persons Other than Grunts"—Marines who fill non-combat roles such as cooks, clerks, and mechanics. Poges are a favorite target of the front-line troops' derision, and vice versa.

"The Spirit of the Bayonet"
During Joker's days in recruit training at Parris Island, a drill instructor, Gunnery Sergeant Gerheim, breaks the men's spirits and then rebuilds them as brutal killers. Here, Joker befriends two recruits nicknamed "Cowboy" and "Gomer Pyle". The latter, whose real name is Leonard Pratt, earns the wrath of both Gerheim and the rest of the platoon through his ineptitude and weak character. Though he eventually shows great improvement and wins honors at graduation, the constant abuse unbalances his mind. In a final act of madness, he kills Gerheim and then himself in front of the whole platoon.

"Body Count"
In 1968, during a tour of duty in Vietnam, Joker runs across Cowboy in Da Nang. The two are now, respectively, a war correspondent for the Marines and the assistant leader of the Lusthog Squad. As the Tet Offensive begins, Joker is dispatched to Phu Bai with his photographer, Rafter Man. Here, Joker unwillingly accepts a promotion from corporal to sergeant, and the two journalists travel to Huế to cover the enemy's wartime atrocities and meet Cowboy again. During a battle, Joker is knocked unconscious by a concussion blast and experiences a psychedelic dream sequence. When he comes to several hours later, he learns that the platoon commander was killed by a friendly grenade, and the squad leader went insane and was killed by North Vietnamese Army troops while attacking one of their positions with a BB gun. Later, Joker and Rafter Man battle a sniper who killed another Lusthog Marine and an entire second squad; the battle ends with Rafter Man's first confirmed kill and Cowboy being wounded slightly. As Joker and Rafter Man start back to Phu Bai, Rafter Man panics and dashes into the path of an oncoming tank, which fatally crushes him. Joker is reassigned to Cowboy's squad as a rifleman, as punishment for wearing an unauthorized peace button on his uniform.

"Grunts"
Now stationed at Khe Sanh with Cowboy's squad, Joker accompanies them on a patrol through the surrounding jungle. They encounter another sniper here, who wounds three of the men multiple times. After the company commander goes insane and starts babbling nonsense over the radio, Cowboy decides to pull the squad back and retreat, rather than sacrifice everyone trying to save the wounded men. Animal Mother, the squad's M60 machine gunner, threatens Cowboy's life and refuses to retreat. Promoting Joker to squad leader, Cowboy runs in with his pistol and kills each victim with a shot to the head. However, he is mortally wounded in the process, and before he can kill himself, the sniper shoots him through the hand. Realizing his duty to Cowboy and the squad, Joker kills Cowboy and leads the rest of the men away.

Critical reception
Kirkus Reviews called The Short-Timers "a terse spitball of a book, fine and real and terrifying, that marks a real advance in Vietnam war literature." The Washington Post wrote: "There is a vivid description of Hue in the aftermath of the 1968 Tet offensive and a grimly realistic portrayal of Marines under siege at Khesanh. Hasford also includes the obligatory scenes of search-and-destroy jungle patrols, unexpected fire fights, and random episodes of gratuitous violence, including maiming, fragging and raping. All this has been presented in much better literary and dramatic terms elsewhere."

Film adaptation

Hasford, Michael Herr, and Stanley Kubrick adapted the novel into the film Full Metal Jacket (1987). The film faithfully reproduces the first section of the novel, "The Spirit of the Bayonet", with only minor differences in events and names. The most profound difference is that, in the book, when Private Pyle kills Gunny (Gunnery Sergeant) Gerheim (renamed Hartman in the film), Gerheim tells Pyle, "I'm proud [of you]", before dying, finally satisfied that he transformed Pyle into a killer. The second part of the movie combines certain dialogue and plot elements of "Body Count" and "Grunts". For example, the combat in the film takes place in Huế, and the platoon does take on a sniper, although the on-screen sequence more closely resembles the sniper battle in "Grunts".

Several important sequences are omitted from the film adaptation, including: a previous meeting between Joker and his squad at the movies, the slaughtering of rats at the camp by Joker and his friends as Rafter Man watches, Rafter Man's lapse into cannibalism, a description of a tank running over a girl and a water buffalo, and a flashback revealing the origins of the nickname Rafter Man (actually named Lance Corporal Compton). In the book, Rafter Man is later run over and killed by the same tank that ran over the girl and water buffalo, and Joker is reassigned to Cowboy's squad as a rifleman for wearing an unauthorized peace button on his uniform.

Additionally, the film adaptation changes some characters' names and omits certain other characters, i.e., several "lifers" (Captain January, Major Lynch, and General Motors) have been left out or have been merged into one character; Private Leonard Pratt in the book is renamed Leonard Lawrence in the movie; Gunnery Sergeant Gerheim in the book is renamed Hartman in the movie; and the character of Alice in the book seems to have been renamed and altered slightly to appear as Eightball in the movie. In additional divergences from the book, in the film T.H.E. Rock does not die, and Crazy Earl is killed by a booby trap. The book characters Daytona Dave, Chili Vendor, and Mr. Payback appear in the movie, just prior to and during the Tet Offensive, but in the book Daytona Dave is described as a California surfer-type, while in the movie he is played by an African American.

Availability
According to the Gustav Hasford website maintained by Hasford's cousin Jason Aaron, The Short-Timers, The Phantom Blooper: A Novel of Vietnam, and Hasford's third and last completed book, a noir detective novel titled A Gypsy Good Time (1992), are currently out of print. The texts of the two war novels and an excerpt of A Gypsy Good Time were publicly available at the web-site for at least a decade, but the site has since been redesigned, and Aaron, who manages the site, has stated he "likely won't be reposting the novel" there as he does not own the rights.

References

External links 
GustavHasford.com Official Gustav Hasford Home Page
Version of the Gustav Hasford home page archived on January 31, 2011, with the full text of The Short-Timers and The Phantom Blooper novels included

1979 American novels
Anti-war novels
American autobiographical novels
American novels adapted into films
Novels set during the Vietnam War
Works about the United States Marine Corps
Da Nang in fiction